John Cokeworthy may refer to:

John Cokeworthy I
John Cokeworthy II, MP for Wareham (UK Parliament constituency)